Lapės  (Polish: Łopie) is a small town in Kaunas County in central Lithuania. The Lithuanian name of the village translates into foxes. In 2011 it had a population of 1,218.

History
The village was first mentioned in sources in 1591, as the property of the noble Polish family Czacki, and subsequently, it belonged to the families: Siwicki, Ratowt, and in the 19th century to Kacper and Józef Sokołowski. In 1922 90% of the village population declared themselves Polish. In 1926 the total population of Lapės was 4604 with 4144 Poles, 267 Russians, 138 ethnic Lithuanians, 28 Jews and 27 Germans.

References

Towns in Lithuania
Towns in Kaunas County